The 2022–23 LSU Tigers women's basketball represents Louisiana State University in the 2022–23 college basketball season. Led by second year head coach Kim Mulkey, the team plays their games at Pete Maravich Assembly Center and are members of the Southeastern Conference.

Schedule and results

|-
!colspan=12 style=|Exhibition
|-

|-
!colspan=12 style=|Non-conference regular season

|-
!colspan=12 style=|SEC regular season

|-
!colspan=9 style=| SEC Tournament

|-
!colspan=9 style=| NCAA Tournament

Rankings

See also
 2022–23 LSU Tigers men's basketball team

References

LSU Lady Tigers basketball seasons
LSU Tigers
LSU Tigers women's basketball
LSU Tigers women's basketball
LSU